Ion Foti (December 11, 1887–1946) was an Ottoman-born Romanian poet, prose writer, journalist and translator.

He was born into an Aromanian family in Kleisoura, a village that formed part of the Ottoman Empire's Manastir Vilayet and is now in Greece. His father was a trader. After completing high school in Bitola, Foti emigrated to the Romanian Old Kingdom, where he attended the literature and philosophy faculty of Bucharest University. His first published work, the Aromanian-language Cântițe si-ndoauă isturii aleapte, appeared in 1912. He was a correspondent for the Athenian newspaper Elefthero Vima, an editor at Bucharest's Viitorul newspaper and, together with Romulus P. Voinescu, co-directed the cultural bimonthly Propilee literare (1926-1929). Foti's work appeared in Sămănătorul, Luceafărul, Literatorul, Convorbiri Critice, Flacăra and Universul. He translated Aeschylus, as well as Oriental and German poems into Romanian and Aromanian. In 1925, he won the Romanian Writers' Society prize for poetry.

Notes

1872 births
1941 deaths
Aromanians from the Ottoman Empire
Romanian people of Aromanian descent
Emigrants from the Ottoman Empire to Romania
University of Bucharest alumni
Aromanian editors
Romanian newspaper editors
Romanian magazine editors
Romanian translators
Aromanian translators
19th-century Romanian poets
Aromanian poets
Romanian male poets
19th-century translators
People from Kastoria (regional unit)